Stuart M. Rosen (June 26, 1939 – August 4, 2019) was an American voice director and voice actor.

History
Shortly after graduating from California State College, Long Beach, Rosen got work as a production assistant at KCET. He wrote and starred in the TV series Dusty's Treehouse from 1968 to 1980.

Rosen voice directed many cartoons and commercials for television, including MASK,  Hulk Hogan's Rock 'n' Wrestling,  Fraggle Rock, the first episodes of Teenage Mutant Ninja Turtles (1987 TV series), The Legend of Prince Valiant,  Super Secret Secret Squirrel segments of 2 Stupid Dogs,  Biker Mice from Mars and many more.

Other such shows soon followed: Batman: The Animated Series, The Pirates of Dark Water, X-Men, Spider-Man: The Animated Series  and Superman: The Animated Series directed by Andrea Romano, Gordon Hunt, Dan Hennessey and Tony Pastor, and Phantom 2040 also directed by Rosen.

Rosen had also had live-action roles in Rome and The Huntress.

Death
Rosen died on August 4, 2019, at the age of 80, from cancer.

Dusty's Treehouse
Dusty's Treehouse is a children's television program which starred Stuart Rosen and featured the puppets of Tony Urbano; while mainly airing as a local series, the show premiered nationally in fall 1975. Rosen was the creator and co-executive producer and based it on a program titled Dusty's Attic, which he developed and aired from 1966–67 on KCET, then an NET station in Los Angeles. The show won eight Emmy Awards.

Dusty's Treehouse originated from KNXT (now KCBS-TV), the local CBS flagship TV station in Los Angeles. It ran from 1970–1980 and was briefly syndicated nationally (including on the rest of the CBS O&O stations) and then appeared in reruns during the inaugural launching of the Nickelodeon children's cable TV network for four additional seasons.

Carrying on in a traditional style similar to Mister Rogers' Neighborhood and Captain Kangaroo, the show featured Dusty (Rosen) and his amazing custom-built treehouse where anything and everything could happen. Often Dusty had conversations with his puppet-animal friends including Maxine the crow, Scooter the squirrel and Stanley the red-haired spider in sneakers. Dusty also went on "tree trips" (field trips via balloon and basket) to factories to see how products were made, or to parks, zoos, aquariums, and so on. Other puppets and shadow puppets enacted classic fairy tales, too, including Cinderella, Beauty & the Beast, Puss in Boots, and The Legend of Sleepy Hollow. Topics included school performance, politics, music, behavior vs. misbehavior, kindness to others, good health habits, asking for help and even "being careful what you wish for," in an episode where Maxine magically becomes an ear of corn, Scooter becomes a walnut, Stanley becomes an apple and Dusty disappears. Jokes, songs and comic antics ensued, but always with a moral lesson to be learned. Sometimes a serious topic was tackled, ranging from Stanley coping with the death of his pet goldfish to Scooter being hit by a car for chasing a baseball out into traffic during game practice.

One episode involved Dusty himself learning a life lesson about how eating heavy food before bedtime (Maxine warns) causes nightmares; Dusty goes on a black light theatre journey through Nightmare Land and is chased by the menacing Mister Stomach Ache.  But a new friend is made in the form of Sonja the gypsy fortune teller, a character who would reappear frequently in the show not by way of Nightmare Land.

In later seasons, the treehouse got a makeover and new supporting characters were introduced like Sunny and Stormy, two female puppets with opposing positive/negative viewpoints, and the mysterious Meef, a hairy, comical stranger with a pack-rat habit of swiping unguarded objects.

Filmography

Television
 2 Stupid Dogs – Additional Voices
 Biker Mice from Mars – Pit Boss, The Governor
 Fraggle Rock – Storyteller
 Iron Man – Crimson Dynamo (2nd voice)
 Kissyfur – Floyd, Stuckey
 My Little Pony and Friends – Additional Voices
 Phantom 2040 – Biot, GP Biot, Officious Stringer, Commander
 Superman - Catcher Henchman (in "Triple-Play")
 The Legend of Prince Valiant – Additional Voices
 The Mask: Animated Series – Additional Voices
 Wild West C.O.W.-Boys of Moo Mesa – Additional Voices
 Zazoo U – Dr. Russell

Film
 Annabelle's Wish – Doctor

Video games
 Gabriel Knight: Sins of the Fathers – Priest, Phone Guy #5, Beignet Vendor
 Quest for Glory IV: Shadows of Darkness – Yuri Markarov

Crew work
 2 Stupid Dogs – Recording Director
 ABC Weekend Specials – Recording Director (The Legend of Lochnagar)
 Attack of the Killer Tomatoes: The Animated Series – Casting & Voice Director
 BattleTech: The Animated Series – Voice Director
 Biker Mice From Mars – Voice Director
 Captain N: The Game Master – Casting Director
 Defenders of the Earth – Voice Director
 Eek! The Cat – Casting Director, Sound Design
 Fantastic Four – Casting Director
 Fraggle Rock – Voice Director, Director
 Gabriel Knight: Sins of the Fathers – Voice Director
 Gabriel Knight 3: Blood of the Sacred, Blood of the Damned – Voice Director
 Hulk Hogan's Rock 'n' Wrestling – Voice Director
 King's Quest VI: Heir Today, Gone Tomorrow – Voice Director
 Kissyfur – Voice Director
 Little Dracula – Voice Director
 Little Shop – Voice Director
 MASK – Voice Director, Dialogue Coach
 My Little Pony: The Movie – Voice Director
 Phantom 2040 – Voice Director, Director
 Piggsburg Pigs! – Voice Director, Sound Design
 P.J. Sparkles – Casting & Voice Director
 Pryde of the X-Men – Voice Director
 RoboCop: The Animated Series – Voice Director
 Siegfried & Roy: Masters of the Impossible – Voice Director
 Space Strikers – Voice Director
 Teenage Mutant Ninja Turtles – Casting Director
 The GLO Friends Save Christmas – Voice Director
 The Incredible Hulk – Casting Director
 The Legend of Prince Valiant – Voice Director
 The Little Lulu Show – Voice Director
 The Magic Paintbrush – Voice Director
 The Mouse and the Monster – Voice Director
 The Old Man of Lochnagar – Sound Design
 Zazoo U – Casting Director

References

External links
 

1939 births
2019 deaths
Writers from Joliet, Illinois
American male voice actors
American puppeteers
American casting directors
American voice directors
American sound designers
American television directors
American television writers
American male screenwriters
Deaths from cancer in California
American male television writers
Male actors from Illinois